William Forrest (11 January 1835 – 23 April 1903) was an Australian pastoralist, company director and politician, a member of the Queensland Legislative Council.

Forrest was born in Ballykelly, County Londonderry, Ireland, educated privately and studied at Glasgow.
Forrest  arrived in Melbourne aboard the Ravenscraig in December 1853 and moved to Queensland in 1860. Forrest was a member of the Queensland firm of B. D. Morehead & Co.

Forrest was appointed a member of the Legislative Council on 15 March 1883, holding this position until his death on 23 April 1903. Forrest was buried in Toowong Cemetery.

References

1835 births
1903 deaths
Members of the Queensland Legislative Council
Irish emigrants to colonial Australia
Politicians from County Londonderry
Australian pastoralists
Burials at Toowong Cemetery
19th-century Australian politicians
19th-century Australian businesspeople